The 2011 World Orienteering Championships, the 28th World Orienteering Championships, were held in Savoie, France, 13 –20 August 2011.

The championships had eight events; sprint for men and women, middle distance for men and women, long distance (formerly called individual or classic distance) for men and women, and relays for men and women.

Medalists

Results

Men's long distance

References 

2011
2011 in French sport
International sports competitions hosted by France
Orienteering in Europe
Sport in Savoie
August 2011 sports events in France